The 1974 Italian Open – Men's doubles was an event of the 1974 Italian Open tennis tournament and was played at the Foro Italico in Rome, Italy from 26 May through 3 June 1974. The draw comprised 32 teams of which four were seeded. John Newcombe and Tom Okker were the defending doubles champions but did not compete in this edition. Unseeded Brian Gottfried and Raúl Ramírez won the doubles title, defeating second-seeded Andrés Gimeno and Ilie Năstase in the final, 6–3, 6–2, 6–3.

Seeds

Draw

Finals

Top half

Bottom half

References

External links
 ITF tournament edition details

Italian Open
Italian Open (tennis)
Italian Open
Italian Open
1974 in Italian tennis